Burlington is an unincorporated area located in Prince County in western Prince Edward Island just north-east of Kensington. It is the site of the Burlington Amusement Park (go-carts) and the former Woodleigh Replicas, a once-popular tourist destination.

External links
 Government of PEI profile

Communities in Prince County, Prince Edward Island